Uma Thomas is an Indian politician serving as a member of the Kerala Legislative Assembly, representing Thrikkakkara assembly. She won the 2022 Thrikkakara byelections with a margin of 25,016 votes, which were held due to the death of her husband P. T. Thomas. Uma Thomas is the lone woman member from Indian National Congress in Kerala Legislative Assembly.

References 

Indian National Congress politicians from Kerala
Kerala MLAs 2021–2026
People from Ernakulam district
Living people
Year of birth missing (living people)
Women members of the Kerala Legislative Assembly
21st-century Indian women politicians